The Ouvèze is a river in southern France and left tributary of the Rhône. It rises in the southern French Prealps (the Baronnies), in the commune of Montauban-sur-l'Ouvèze. It flows into the Rhône in Sorgues, north of Avignon. The Sorgue is one of its tributaries.

The Ouvèze passes through the following départements and towns:

Drôme: Buis-les-Baronnies, Mollans-sur-Ouvèze
Vaucluse: Vaison-la-Romaine,  Bédarrides, Sorgues

References

Rivers of France
Rivers of Drôme
Rivers of Vaucluse
Rivers of Auvergne-Rhône-Alpes
Rivers of Provence-Alpes-Côte d'Azur